Krishna Sankar  is an Indian actor who appears in Malayalam films. His notable films include  Neram (2013), Premam (2015), Marubhoomiyile Aana (2016) and Njandukalude Nattil Oridavela (2017).

Career
Krishna Sankar started his career as an actor through the 2013 comedy-thriller film Neram directed by his friend Alphonse Puthren. He portrayed  the character Manikunju in the film. He became popular to Kerala audiences for the 2015 film Premam through the character Koya. Marubhoomiyile Aana released in 2016 was also popular. He acted in the lead alongside Samskruthy Shenoy in the comedy film directed by V K Prakash. Shankar played an important role in Allu Ramendran and portrays the lead role in Kochaal. He will be producing his next film under his banner SVK Productions titled Kudukku 2025 and will be playing the lead role alongside Durga Krishna.

Filmography

References

External links 

Indian male film actors
Male actors in Malayalam cinema
Living people
Year of birth missing (living people)